The Ludwig Schuster Quartet was a string quartet from Halle (Saale) active in the 1950s and 1960s. It was named after first violin Ludwig Schuster (concertmaster at the Landestheater Halle).

Members 
Members of the ensemble were Ludwig Schuster (1st violin), Adam Busch and Georg Hanstedt (2nd violin), Walter Ziegler (viola) and Otto Kleist (cello).

History 
According to Konstanze Musketa "it played a pioneering role in the field of Neue Musik". Thus it premiered several pieces, among others the String Quartet No. 8 "Die Nachgeburt" by Max Butting (1958), the String Quartet No. 1 by Gerhard Wohlgemuth (1960), the 2nd string quartet "Mors et Vita" by Jón Leifs (1960), the String Quartet No. 2 by Leo Spies (1964) and the String Quartet in E major by Hans Stieber (1965).

In 1957 it gave a guest performance at the Berliner Festtage.

Awards 
In 1963 the string quartet was awarded the Handel Prize.

Discography 
 Leo Spies: String quartet no. 2 (Eterna 1966)
 Max Butting: String quartet no. 8 (Eterna 1968)

References

External links 
 

German string quartets